Kelly Middaugh (born August 2, 1999) is a Canadian curler from Victoria Harbour, Ontario. She currently plays lead on Team Laurie St-Georges.

Career
While attending Wilfrid Laurier University, Middaugh competed in two U Sports/Curling Canada University Curling Championships. In 2018, as second for the team skipped by Kaitlin Jewer, they finished with a 3–4 round robin record, failing to advance to the playoffs. At the 2020 U Sports/Curling Canada University Curling Championships, the team, led by Isabelle Ladouceur, finished in sixth place with a 2–5 record.

During the 2018–19 season, Middaugh played lead for the Emma Wallingford rink. The team competed in one women's event, the Royal LePage Women's Fall Classic, where they were able to find success. After dropping their first two games, the team won four straight sudden death games to qualify for the playoffs. They were then defeated by Isabella Wranå in the quarterfinals. At the 2018 Ontario U-21 Curling Championships, the team qualified for the playoffs with a 4–3 record. They then lost to the eventual champions Thea Coburn 7–6 in the semifinals.

For the 2019–20 season, Middaugh joined the Isabelle Ladouceur rink at lead. At the Ontario junior championship, they failed to reach the playoffs after a 3–4 round robin record. The following season, the team competed in and won the Bally Haly Cash Spiel, posting an undefeated 6–0 record throughout the event. They also competed in The Curling Store Cashspiel and the Lakeshore U21 Junior Women's Spiel, losing in the semifinals of both events to Christina Black and Celia Evans respectively.

After two seasons playing for Team Ladouceur, Middaugh was added to the Jacqueline Harrison rink for the 2021–22 season as their alternate. The team also included third Allison Flaxey, second Lynn Kreviazuk and lead Laura Hickey. The team had a strong start to the season, beginning with a semifinal loss at the 2021 Oakville Fall Classic to Suzanne Birt. They then lost two straight quarterfinal games at the 2021 Oakville Labour Day Classic and Stu Sells Toronto Tankard, both to Hollie Duncan. With their successful results over the season, Team Harrison had enough points to qualify for the 2021 Canadian Olympic Curling Pre-Trials. There, they posted a 5–1 record through the round robin, qualifying for the playoffs. They then beat Suzanne Birt in the A event semifinal before dropping the first final 9–6 to Krista McCarville. They rebounded with a 9–2 victory over Corryn Brown to earn the ninth and final spot in the 2021 Canadian Olympic Curling Trials. Middaugh did not compete in the trials with the team.

Personal life
Middaugh is currently an outdoor adventure naturalist program student at Algonquin College She previously attended Wilfrid Laurier University. She is engaged to Kenny Malcolmson. Her parents Wayne and Sherry are also accomplished curlers.

Teams

References

External links

1999 births
Canadian women curlers
Living people
20th-century Canadian women
21st-century Canadian women
Wilfrid Laurier University alumni
Algonquin College alumni
Curlers from Simcoe County
People from Midland, Ontario